Christian Democracy (Christianiki Dimokratia) is a Greek political party founded on May 12, 1953.

In the national elections of 1956 the party gained only 0.01%. Its youth organization, Greek Christian Democratic Youth Organisation (Ελληνική Χριστιανοδημοκρατική Οργάνωση Νέων (Ε.Χ.Ο.Ν.)), was established in 1961. In the National Elections of 1963 the party gained 0.03%.

During the Greek military junta of 1967–1974 its leader Nikos Psaroudakis was exiled by the regime in Gyaros.

After the restoration of democracy, the party participated with Centre Union – New Forces in the national elections of 1974. In the national elections of 1977 it participated in Progress and Left Forces Alliance, a coalition of small left-wing parties. In the elections for the European Parliament in 1981 the party gained 1.15% and in the National Elections of 1981 gained 0.15%. It also participated in the elections for the European Parliament in 1984 and gained 0.45% and in the national elections of June 1989 gained 0.2%.

It supported PASOK in the national elections of 1985 and Democratic Revival in the national elections of 2007.

External links
 

1953 establishments in Greece
Christian political parties
Christian socialist organizations
Democratic socialist parties in Europe
Political parties established in 1953
Socialist parties in Greece